Susanne König (born 30 May 1974) is a German fencer. She competed in the women's individual sabre event at the 2004 Summer Olympics.

References

External links
 

1974 births
Living people
German female fencers
Olympic fencers of Germany
Fencers at the 2004 Summer Olympics
Sportspeople from Satu Mare